Mark Hamilton may refer to:

Mark Hamilton (canoeist) (born 1961), American sprint canoer
Mark Hamilton (doctor) (born 1970), British doctor and radio show host
Mark Hamilton (baseball) (born 1984), American baseball player
Mark Hamilton (bassist), bass guitarist for the Northern Irish alternative rock band Ash
Mark Hamilton (guitarist), with UK rock band Quench
Mark Hamilton (singer), Canadian indie rock musician with Woodpigeon
Mark Hamilton (writer), publisher of Neo-Tech literature
Mark R. Hamilton (born 1940s), American academic and former president of the University of Alaska
Mark Hamilton (politician) (born 1956), American politician in the Georgia House of Representatives
Friar Mark Hamilton, Scottish Dominican monk and author

See also
Marc Hamilton (born 1944), French Canadian singer from Quebec
 Hamilton (name)